Jeremy's Run is a stream in Page County, Virginia.

Jeremy's Run originates from rainwater flowing down the west slope of Elkwallow Gap in the Blue Ridge Mountains.  Elkwallow Gap is a topographical saddle that divides Neighbor Mountain and Hogback Mountain, situated in Shenandoah National Park.  Jeremy's Run flows southwest from the gap, to the Great Appalachian Valley.

Watercourse
From Elkwallow Gap, the stream flows southward and later westward through a hollow that separates the northern arm of Neighbor Mountain from Knob Mountain.  A hiking trail known as Jeremy's Run Trail crosses the stream 14 times in the national park.  Jeremy's Run then takes a northwest course, and passes under Virginia Route 340.  It tributes the south fork of the Shenandoah River west of the highway.

Drainage
Jeremy's Run drains into the Shenandoah River, which in turn is part of the Potomac River watershed, which drains into the Chesapeake Bay.

Fishing
There are many long pools in the lower section of the stream that are home to brook trout.

Route 340 Jeremy's Run Bridge
A replacement bridge over Jeremy's Run on Route 340 was scheduled to be completed November 12, 2009.  The projected cost is $7,674.952.55, and the work is being completed by General Excavation Inc. of Warrenton, Va.

See also
List of rivers of Virginia

References

Rivers of Virginia
Rivers of Page County, Virginia